Indothais pinangensis is a species of sea snail, a marine gastropod mollusk, in the family Muricidae, the murex snails or rock snails.

References

External links
  Tan K.S. & Sigurdsson J.B. (1996) Two new species of Thais (Mollusca: Neogastropoda: Muricidae) from peninsular Malaysia and Singapore, with notes on T. tissoti (Petit, 1852) and T. blanfordi (Melvill, 1893) from Bombay, India. Raffles Bulletin of Zoology 44(1): 77-107

pinangensis
Gastropods described in 1996